Main Street Lawyer is a 1939 American crime film directed by Dudley Murphy and written by Joseph Krumgold and Devery Freeman. The film stars Edward Ellis, Anita Louise, Robert Baldwin, Harold Huber, Clem Bevans and Margaret Hamilton. The film was released on November 3, 1939, by Republic Pictures.

Plot

Cast
Edward Ellis as Abraham Lincoln 'Link' Boggs
Anita Louise as Honey Boggs
Robert Baldwin as Tom Morris
Harold Huber as Tony Marco
Clem Bevans as Zeke
Margaret Hamilton as Lucy
Beverly Roberts as Flossie
Henry Kolker as Donnelly
Willard Robertson as John Ralston
Richard Lane as Ballou
Ferris Taylor as Trial Judge
Wallis Clark as Reynolds

References

External links
 

1939 films
American crime films
1939 crime films
Republic Pictures films
Films directed by Dudley Murphy
American black-and-white films
1930s English-language films
1930s American films